The Tamangic languages, TGTM languages, or West Bodish languages, are a family of Sino-Tibetan languages spoken in the Himalayas of Nepal. They are called "West Bodish" by Bradley (1997), from Bod, the native term for Tibet. TGTM stands for Tamang-Gurung-Thakali-Manang.

Proto-TGTM has been reconstructed in Mazaudon (1994). Tamangic is united with the Bodish and West Himalayish languages in Bradley's (1997) "Bodish" and Van Driem's (2001) Tibeto-Kanauri.

Languages

The Tamangic languages are:
Tamang (several divergent varieties, with a million speakers)
Gurung (two varieties with low mutual intelligibility)
Thakali (including the Seke dialect; ethnically Tamang)
Manang language cluster: the closely related Manang, Gyasumdo, Nar Phu, and Nyeshangte languages.
Chantyal
Ghale languages (Ghale and Kutang): spoken by ethnic Tamang, perhaps related to Tamangic.
Kaike (moribund): may be the most divergent.

Footnotes

References
 Bradley, David (1997). "Tibeto-Burman languages and classification". In Tibeto-Burman languages of the Himalayas, Papers in South East Asian linguistics. Canberra: Pacific Linguistics.
 George van Driem (2001) Languages of the Himalayas: An Ethnolinguistic Handbook of the Greater Himalayan Region. Brill.

 Mazaudon, Martine. 1994. Problèmes de comparatisme et de reconstruction dans quelques langues de la famille tibéto-birmane. Thèse d'Etat, Université de la Sorbonne Nouvelle.